The Peru national futsal team represents Peru in international futsal competitions, such as the World Cup and the Copa América. It is governed by the Federación Peruana de Futbol (FPF).

Tournament records

FIFA Futsal World Cup
 1989 - Did not enter
 1992 - Did not enter
 1996 - Did not enter
 2000 - Did not qualify
 2004 - Did not qualify
 2008 - Did not qualify
 2012 - Did not qualify
 2016 - Did not qualify
 2020 - Did not qualify

FIFUSA/AMF Futsal World Cup
 1982 – Did not enter
 1985 – Did not enter
 1988 – Did not enter
 1991 – Did not enter
 1994 – Did not enter
 1997 – Did not enter
 2000 – Did not enter
 2003 – 4th place
 2007 – 4th place
 2011 – Quarterfinals
 2015 – Did not enter
 2019 – TBD

Copa América de Futsal
 1965 - Did not enter
 1969 - Did not enter
 1971 - 4th place
 1973 - Did not enter
 1975 - Did not enter
 1976 - Did not enter
 1977 - Did not enter
 1979 - Did not enter
 1983 - Did not enter
 1986 - Did not enter
 1989 - Did not enter
 1992 – Did not enter
 1995 – Did not enter
 1996 – Did not enter
 1997 – Did not enter
 1998 – Did not enter
 1999 – Did not enter
 2000 – 1st round
 2003 – 6th place
 2008 – 7th place
 2011 – 1st round
 2015 – 8th place
 2017 – 9th place
 2022 – 9th place

FIFA Futsal World Cup qualification (CONMEBOL)/CONMEBOL Preliminary Competition
 2012 – 7th place
 2016 – 10th place

Grand Prix de Futsal
 2005 – did not enter
 2006 – did not enter
 2007 – did not enter
 2008 – 15th place
 2009 – 11th place
 2010 – did not enter
 2011 – did not enter
 2013 – did not enter
 2014 – did not enter
 2015 – did not enter
 2017 – TBD

Current squad
Players called up for the Grand Prix of Futsal 2009 held in Brazil.
Coach: Pedro Sandoval

References

External links
Peru Football Federation

South American national futsal teams
National sports teams of Peru
National